Neda may refer to:

People
 Neda (musician) (Tenielle Neda, born 1987), an Australian singer-songwriter 
 Ana-Neda, Empress consort of Bulgaria 1323–1324
 Musaed Neda (born 1983), Kuwaiti footballer
 Neda Agha-Soltan (1983–2009), shot dead during the 2009 Iranian election protests
 Neda Soltani (born 1977), Iranian exile, mistaken for Neda Agha-Soltan
 Neda Al-Hilali (born 1938), American fiber artist
 Neda Alijani (born 1981), Iranian physician 
 Neda Arnerić (1953–2020), Serbian actress
 Neda Bahi (born 1992), Tunisian Paralympic athlete 
 Neda Maghbouleh, American-born Canadian sociologist, writer 
 Neda Moridpour, artist and activist
 Neda Naldi (1913–1993), Italian actress
 Neda Parmać (born 1985), Croatian singer and member of Feminnem
 Neda Shahsavari (born 1986), Iranian table tennis player
 Neda Spasojević (1941–1981), Serbian actress
 Neda Ukraden (born 1950), Croatian pop singer
 Neda Ulaby (born c. 1970), American journalist
 Neda Hassani (1977–2003), Iranian protester

Mythology
 Neda (mythology), a nymph in Greek mythology

Places
 Neda, Galicia, Spain
 Neda (river), Greece
 Neda, Wisconsin, U.S.
 Neda Formation, a geologic formation in Illinois, U.S.

Other uses
 Neda (insect), a genus of beetle in family Coccinellidae
 National Eating Disorders Association, U.S.
 National Economic and Development Authority, Philippines
 National Educational Debate Association, U.S.
 National Electronic Distributors Association, U.S.
 North-East Democratic Alliance, a political coalition in northeast India

See also

Nedda, a name
Nela (name)